Schönberg Family is a painting by Richard Gerstl, from 1907.

Description 
The painting is an oil on canvas, with dimensions 109.7 x 88.8 centimeters. 
It is in the collection of the mumok, in Vienna.

Analysis 
Gerstl painted a group portrait of the Arnold Schoenberg family, and gave painting lessons.

References

Sources 
Arts Magazine, Volume 58, Issues 6-10, Art Digest Incorporated, 1984

1907 paintings